Raj Kumar Ray or Raj Kumar Yadav is an Indian politician. He was MLA of Bihar Legislative Assembly from Hasanpur as a member of the Janata Dal (United) from 2010 to 2020.

References

People from Samastipur district
Bihar MLAs 2015–2020
Bihar MLAs 2010–2015
1972 births
Living people
Janata Dal (United) politicians